The FE Series is a series of digital cameras from Olympus.  The line was launched with the introduction of the FE-100 in September 2005.  The most recent addition to the series, the FE-5010, was launched in January 2009.

Overview

FE-130

FE-190

The Olympus FE-190/X-750, more commonly known as the Olympus FE-190 is a digital camera made by the Olympus Imaging Corp.

The FE-190 weighs 150 grams, and is 91 x 59 x 19 mm. It uses an xD-Picture Card for storage, and connects to the computer using USB. The camera comes with Olympus Master, which is a program that transfers images from the camera to the computer. The FE-190 delivers a maximum resolution of 2816 x 2112. It can also be set at a lower resolution of 2048 x 1536 or 640 x 480.

Features
 6 megapixels
 3x Optical zoom
 4x Digital zoom
 2.5" LCD screen
 Movie recording function with sound
 10 scene modes
 Internal memory
 Li-Ion rechargeable battery
 Timer
 115,000 pixels in 2.5 in. LCD screen

See also
List of Olympus products

References
 FE-130 product page

External links

FE-130
cnet review of the FE-130

FE-190
 FE-190 at Olympus' official website
 DOCameras.com review of the FE-190

FE Series